Nuclear power is the fifth-largest source of electricity in India after coal, gas, hydroelectricity and wind power. , India has 22 nuclear reactors in operation in 8 nuclear power plants, with a total installed capacity of 7,380 MW. 
Nuclear power produced a total of 43 TWh in 2020-21, contributing 3.11% of total power generation in India (1,382 TWh). 10 more reactors are under construction with a combined generation capacity of 8,000 MW.

In October 2010, India drew up a plan to reach a nuclear power capacity of 63 GW in 2032. However, following the 2011 Fukushima nuclear disaster there have been numerous anti-nuclear protests at proposed nuclear power plant sites.
There have been mass protests against the Jaitapur Nuclear Power Project in Maharashtra and the Kudankulam Nuclear Power Plant in Tamil Nadu, and a proposed large nuclear power plant near Haripur was refused permission by the Government of West Bengal.
A Public Interest Litigation (PIL) has also been filed against the government’s civil nuclear programme at the Supreme Court.

Nuclear power in India has suffered from generally low capacity factors. 
As of 2021, the lifetime weighted energy availability factor of the Indian fleet is 66.1%.
However, capacity factors have been improving in recent years. The availability factor of Indian reactors was 74.4% in the years 2019-2021.
One of the main reasons for the low capacity factors is lack of nuclear fuel.

India has been making advances in the field of thorium-based fuels, working to design and develop a prototype for an atomic reactor using thorium and low-enriched uranium, a key part of India's three stage nuclear power programme.

History

Early nuclear physics research
As early as 1901, the Geological Survey of India (GSI) had recognised India as potentially having significant deposits of radioactive ores, including pitchblende, uranium and thorianite. In the ensuing 50 years, however, little to no effort was made to exploit those resources. During the 1920s and 1930s, Indian scientists maintained close links to their counterparts in Europe and the United States, and were well aware of the latest developments in physics. Several Indian physicists, notably Daulat Singh Kothari, Meghnad Saha, Homi J. Bhabha and R. S. Krishnan, conducted pioneering research in nuclear physics in Europe during the 1930s.

By 1939, Meghnad Saha, the Palit Professor of Physics at the University of Calcutta, had recognised the significance of the discovery of nuclear fission, and had begun to conduct various experiments in his laboratory related to nuclear physics. In 1940, he incorporated nuclear physics into the university's post-graduate curriculum. In the same year, the Sir Dorabji Tata Trust sanctioned funds for installing a cyclotron at the University of Calcutta, but various difficulties likely related to the war delayed the project. In 1944, Homi J. Bhabha, a distinguished nuclear physicist who had established a research school at the Indian Institute of Science, Bangalore, wrote a letter to his distant cousin J. R. D. Tata, the chairman of the Tata Group. He requested funds to establish a research institute of fundamental physics, "with special reference to cosmic rays and nuclear physics." The Tata Institute of Fundamental Research (TIFR) was inaugurated in Mumbai the following year.

Establishment of atomic energy in India
Following the atomic bombing of Hiroshima in August 1945, R.S. Krishnan, a nuclear physicist who had studied under Norman Feather and John Cockcroft, and who recognised the massive energy-generating potential of uranium, observed, "If the tremendous energy released from atomic explosions is made available to drive machinery, etc., it will bring about an industrial revolution of a far-reaching character." He further noted, however, the difficulties in harnessing nuclear power for peaceful usage, "...a great deal more research work is needed before atomic power can be put to industrial use."

In March 1946, the Board of Scientific and Industrial Research (BSIR), under the Council of Scientific and Industrial Research (CSIR), set up an Atomic Research Committee under Bhabha's leadership to explore India's atomic energy resources and to suggest ways to develop and harness them, along with establishing contacts with similar organisations in other nations. At the same time, the University of Travancore's research council met to discuss Travancore's future industrial development. Among other matters, the council made recommendations for developing the state's resources of monazite, a valuable thorium ore, and ilmenite, with regard to their applications in atomic energy. The council suggested the project could be undertaken by an all-India programme. This was followed by the deputation of Bhabha and Sir Shanti Swarup Bhatnagar, the Director of the CSIR, to Travancore in April 1947 and the establishment of a working relationship with the kingdom's dewan, Sir C. P. Ramaswami Iyer.

Early in 1947, plans were made to establish a Uranium Unit under the Geological Survey of India, to focus on identifying and developing resources of uranium-bearing minerals. In June 1947, two months before Indian independence, Chakravarti Rajagopalachari, then Minister for Industry, Supply, Education and Finance in the Interim Government of India, established an Advisory Board for Research in Atomic Energy. Chaired by Bhabha and placed under the CSIR, the Advisory Board included Saha, Bhatnagar and several other distinguished scientists, notably Sir K. S. Krishnan, the co-discoverer of the Raman effect, geologist Darashaw Nosherwan Wadia and Nazir Ahmed, a student of Ernest Rutherford. A Joint Committee comprising the above scientists and three representatives of the Travancore government was set up to determine how best to utilise Travancore's resources of monazite. Following the independence and partition of India, Travancore briefly declared itself independent before acceding to the new Dominion of India in 1949 after a period of intense negotiations, while Ahmad departed for Pakistan, where he would eventually head that nation's atomic energy agency.

On 23 March 1948, Prime Minister Jawaharlal Nehru introduced the Atomic Energy Bill in the Indian Parliament, and it was subsequently passed as the Indian Atomic Energy Act. Modelled on the British Atomic Energy Act 1946, the Act granted sweeping powers to the central government over nuclear science and research, including surveying for atomic minerals, the development of such mineral resources on an industrial scale, conducting research regarding the scientific and technical problems connected with developing atomic energy for peaceful purposes, the training and education of the necessary personnel and the fostering of fundamental research in the nuclear sciences in Indian laboratories, institutes and universities. Around the same time, the Government of West Bengal sanctioned the construction of a nuclear physics institute under the University of Calcutta; the cornerstone was laid in May 1948, and the institute was inaugurated on 11 January 1950 by Irène Joliot-Curie.

With effect from 1 June 1948, the Advisory Board for Research in Atomic Energy, together with its parent organisation the CSIR, was folded into the new Department of Scientific Research and placed directly under the Prime Minister. On 3 August 1948, the Atomic Energy Commission of India (AEC) was established and made separate from the Department of Scientific Research, with Bhabha as its first chairman. In January 1949, the AEC met to formulate a uniform under- and post-graduate university syllabus for theoretical and fundamental physics and chemistry, to guarantee sufficient numbers of nuclear scientists and to ensure they would receive consistent levels of training and education. In the same year, the Tata Institute of Fundamental Research was designated by the CSIR as the hub for all major nuclear science research projects. In 1950, the government announced it would purchase all available stocks of uranium and beryllium minerals and ores, and declared large rewards for any significant discoveries of the same. On 3 January 1954, the Atomic Energy Establishment, Trombay (AEET) was established by the Atomic Energy Commission to consolidate all nuclear reactor research and technology-related developments; on 3 August, the Atomic Energy Commission and all its subordinate agencies, including the Tata Institute of Fundamental Research and the nuclear research institute at Calcutta University, were transferred to the new Department of Atomic Energy and placed under the direct charge of the Prime Minister's Office. In May 1956, construction on a uranium metal plant and a fuel element fabrication facility for the research reactors began at Trombay; the uranium plant came into operation in January 1959, followed by the fuel element facility in February 1960. The AEET (renamed the Bhabha Atomic Research Centre in 1967, after Bhabha's death) was formally inaugurated by Nehru in January 1957. With the expanding scope of Indian nuclear research, the 1948 Atomic Energy Act was amended in 1961, and was passed as the new Atomic Energy Act, coming into force in September 1962.

Early research reactors

At a meeting of the Atomic Energy Commission on 15 March 1955, the decision was made to construct a small nuclear reactor at Trombay. The reactor would be used for training personnel for the operation of future reactors and for research, including experiments in nuclear physics, studying the effects of irradiation and the production of isotopes for medical, agricultural and industrial research. In October 1955, an agreement was signed by the United Kingdom Atomic Energy Authority and the Indian Department of Atomic Energy, under which Britain would supply uranium fuel elements for a swimming pool reactor to be designed by India. The agreement further ensured the "close cooperation and mutual assistance between the Department and the Authority in the promotion and development of the peaceful uses of atomic energy," and provided for future design and collaboration in the construction of a high flux reactor at a later date. Named Apsara, the reactor was housed in a 100 x 50 x 70 concrete building. India's and Asia's first nuclear reactor, Apsara reached criticality at 3:45 p.m on 4 August 1956 and was inaugurated by Prime Minister Nehru on 20 January 1957.

In April 1955, the Canadian government under Prime Minister Louis St. Laurent offered to assist in building an NRX-type reactor for India under the Colombo Plan, of which both India and Canada were then members. Prime Minister St. Laurent expressed hopes the reactor would serve India well in the development of peaceful atomic research and development. On behalf of the Indian government, Nehru formally accepted the offer that September, stating the reactor would be made available to any accredited foreign scientists, including those from other Colombo Plan member states. On 28 April 1956, Nehru and the Canadian High Commissioner to India Escott Reid signed an agreement for a "Canada-India Colombo Plan Atomic Reactor Project." Under the terms of the agreement, Canada would provide a 40 MW CIRUS reactor for solely research purposes, including the initial manufacture and engineering of the reactor, and would also provide technical expertise, including training Indian personnel in its operation. India would supply the reactor site and foundation, and would also pay all "internal" costs, including the construction of the reactor complex, the costs of local labour and any shipping and insurance fees. Under Article II of the agreement, India would make the reactor facilities available to other Colombo Plan nations. Article III stipulated that the "reactor and any products resulting from its use will be employed for peaceful purposes only;" at the time, however, there were no effective safeguards to ensure this clause. A further agreement was made with the United States government to supply 21 tons of heavy water for the reactor. Construction of the reactor began later in 1956, with Indian technical personnel sent to Chalk River for training. CIRUS was completed in early 1960 and after achieving criticality in July 1960, was inaugurated by Nehru in January 1961. Construction of a third research reactor, ZERLINA (Zero Energy Reactor for Lattice Investigations and New Assemblies) began at Trombay in 1958; ZERLINA was also commissioned in 1961.

Beginnings of commercial nuclear power

In September 1955, the question of building a commercial nuclear power station was raised in Parliament. Shortly after the world's first commercial nuclear power plant came online at Obninsk in the Soviet Union, the Soviets invited a number of Indian experts to visit it; the United States concurrently offered training in atomic energy to Indian technical and scientific personnel. In August 1957, members of the Gujarat Chamber of Commerce in Ahmedabad (then in Bombay State) requested an atomic power station for their city, by which time the Indian government was actively considering the construction of at least "one or more large Atomic Power Stations to generate electricity." By November 1958, the Atomic Energy Commission had recommended construction of two nuclear power stations, each consisting of two units and able to generate 500 MW of power, for a total generating capacity of 1000 MW; the government decided that a minimum of 250 MW of electricity generated from nuclear reactors would be incorporated into the Third Five Year Plan (1961-1966).

In February 1960, it was decided the first power plant would be erected in Western India, with locations in Rajasthan, near Delhi and near Madras noted for future commercial reactors. In September, the Punjab government requested a nuclear power station for their state. On 11 October 1960, the Indian government issued a tender for India's first nuclear power station near Tarapur, Maharashtra and consisting of two reactors, each generating around 150 MW of electricity and to be commissioned in 1965. In August 1961, the Indian and Canadian governments agreed to conduct a joint study on building a Canada-India nuclear power plant in Rajasthan; the reactor would be based on the CANDU reactor at Douglas Point and would generate 200 MW. By this time, seven responses to India's global tender for the Tarapur power station had been received: three from the United States, two from the UK and one each from France and Canada.

The agreement for India's first nuclear power plant at Rajasthan, RAPP-1, was signed in 1963, followed by RAPP-2 in 1966. These reactors contained rigid safeguards to ensure they would not be used for a military programme. RAPP-1 began operation in 1972. Due to technical problems the reactor had to be downrated from 200 MW to 100 MW. The technical and design information were given free of charge by Atomic Energy of Canada Limited to India. The United States and Canada terminated their assistance after the detonation of India's first nuclear explosion in 1974.

Recent developments
After successful commissioning of Kudankulam units 1 & 2, an agreement was made with Russia in June 2017 for the units 5 & 6 (2 x 1000 MW) with an estimated cost of INR 250 million (3.85 million US$) per MW. Earlier, India had also entered in to an agreement with Russia in October 2016 for the units 3 & 4 (2 x 1000 MW) with an estimated cost of INR 200 million (3.08 million US$) per MW.

Nuclear fuel reserves
India's domestic uranium reserves are small and the country is dependent on uranium imports to fuel its nuclear power industry. Since early 1990s, Russia has been a major supplier of nuclear fuel to India. Due to dwindling domestic uranium reserves, electricity generation from nuclear power in India declined by 12.83% from 2006 to 2008. Following a waiver from the Nuclear Suppliers Group (NSG) in September 2008 which allowed it to commence international nuclear trade, India has signed bilateral deals on civilian nuclear energy technology cooperation with several other countries, including France, the United States, the United Kingdom, Canada, and South Korea. India has also uranium supply agreements with Russia, Mongolia, Kazakhstan, Argentina and Namibia. An Indian private company won a uranium exploration contract in Niger.

In March 2011 large deposits of uranium were discovered in the Tummalapalle belt in Andhra Pradesh and in the Bhima basin in Karnataka by the Atomic Minerals Directorate for Exploration and Research (AMD) of India.
The Tummalapalle belt uranium reserves promises to be one of the world's top 20 uranium reserves discoveries.
44,000 tonnes of natural uranium have been discovered in the belt so far, which is estimated to have three times that amount. 
The natural uranium deposits of the Bhima basin has better grade of natural uranium ore, even though it is smaller than the Tummalapalle belt.

In recent years, India has shown increased interest in thorium fuels and fuel cycles because of large deposits of thorium (518,000 tonnes) in the form of monazite in beach sands as compared to very modest reserves of low-grade uranium (92,000 tonnes).

Kazakhstan is the largest supplier of uranium to India providing 5,000 tonnes during 2015-19.Over 15000 tonnes or uranium ore deposits are found in Rajasthan -- Rohil, Sikar District

Nuclear agreements with other nations
As of 2016, India has signed civil nuclear agreements with 14 countries: Argentina, Australia, Canada, Czech Republic, France, Japan, Kazakhstan, Mongolia, Namibia, Russia, South Korea, the United Kingdom, the United States, and Vietnam. The 48-nation NSG granted a waiver to India on 6 September 2008 allowing it to access civilian nuclear technology and fuel from other countries. India is the only country with known nuclear weapons which is not a party to the Non-Proliferation Treaty (NPT) but is still allowed to carry out nuclear commerce with the rest of the world.

India and Mongolia signed a crucial civil nuclear agreement on 15 June 2009 for supply of Uranium to India, during Prime Minister Manmohan Singh's visit to Mongolia making it the fifth nation in the world to seal a civil nuclear pact with India. The MoU on "development of cooperation in the field of peaceful uses of radioactive minerals and nuclear energy" was signed by senior officials in the department of atomic energy of the two countries.

On 2 September 2009, India and Namibia signed five agreements, including one on civil nuclear energy which allows for supply of uranium from the African country. This was signed during President Hifikepunye Pohamba's five-day visit to India in May 2009. Namibia is the fifth largest producer of uranium in the world. The Indo-Namibian agreement in peaceful uses of nuclear energy allows for supply of uranium and setting up of nuclear reactors.

On 14 October 2009, India and Argentina signed an agreement in New Delhi on civil nuclear cooperation and nine other pacts to establish strategic partnership. According to official sources, the agreement was signed by Vivek Katju, Secretary in the Ministry of External Affairs and Argentine foreign minister Jorge Talana. Taking into consideration their respective capabilities and experience in the peaceful uses of nuclear energy, both India and Argentina have agreed to encourage and support scientific, technical and commercial cooperation for mutual benefit in this field.

The Prime Ministers of India and Canada signed a civil nuclear cooperation agreement in Toronto on 28 June 2010 which when all steps are taken, will provide access for Canada's nuclear industry to India's expanding nuclear market and also fuel for India's reactors. Canada is one of the world's largest exporters of uranium and Canada's heavy water nuclear technology is marketed abroad with CANDU-type units operating in India, Pakistan, Argentina, South Korea, Romania and China. On 6 November 2012, India and Canada finalised their 2010 nuclear export agreement, opening the way for Canada to begin uranium exports to India.

On 16 April 2011, India and Kazakhstan signed an inter-governmental agreement for Cooperation in Peaceful Uses of Atomic Energy, that envisages a legal framework for supply of fuel, construction and operation of atomic power plants, exploration and joint mining of uranium, exchange of scientific and research information, reactor safety mechanisms and use of radiation technologies for healthcare. PM Manmohan Singh visited Astana where a deal was signed. After the talks, the Kazakh President Nazarbaev announced that his country would supply India with 2100 tonnes of uranium and was ready to do more. Kazakhstan is the largest producer of uranium in the world.  India and Kazakhstan already have civil nuclear cooperation since January 2009 when Nuclear Power Corporation of India Limited (NPCIL) and Kazakh nuclear company KazAtomProm signed an MoU during the visit of Nazarbaev to Delhi. Under the contract, KazAtomProm supplies uranium which is used by Indian reactors.

South Korea became the latest country to sign a nuclear agreement with India after it got the waiver from the Nuclear Suppliers' Group (NSG) in 2008. On 25 July 2011 India and South Korea signed a nuclear agreement, which will allow South Korea with a legal foundation to participate in India’s nuclear expansion programme, and to bid for constructing nuclear power plants in India.

In 2014, India and Australia signed a civil nuclear agreement which allows the export of uranium to India. This was signed in New Delhi during Australian Prime Minister Tony Abbott's meeting with the Indian Prime Minister Narendra Modi on 4 September 2014. Australia is the third largest producer of uranium in the world. The agreement allows supply of uranium for peaceful generation of power for civil use in India.

India's Prime Minister Narendra Modi and UK Prime Minister David Cameron signed Civil Nuclear Agreement on 12 November 2015.

Reactor agreements
After the Nuclear Suppliers Group agreed to allow nuclear exports to India, France was the first country to sign a civilian nuclear agreement with India, on 30 September 2008. During the December 2010 visit of the French President Nicolas Sarkozy to India, framework agreements were signed for the setting up two third-generation EPR reactors of 1650 MW each at Jaitapur, Maharashtra by the French company Areva. The deal caters for the first set of two of six planned reactors and the supply of nuclear fuel for 25 years. Construction has faced regulatory issues and difficulty in sourcing major components from Japan due to India not being a signatory to the Nuclear Non-Proliferation Treaty.

In April 2021 French group EDF made a binding offer to build six third-generation EPR nuclear reactors at the Jaitapur site, with an installed capacity of 9.6 gigawatts.

In November 2016 Japan signed a nuclear cooperation agreement with India. Japanese nuclear plant builders saw this as potential lifeline given that domestic orders had ended following the Fukushima Daiichi nuclear disaster, and India is proposing to build about 20 new reactors over the next decade.

Russia has an ongoing agreement of 1988 vintage with India regarding establishing of two VVER 1000 MW reactors (water-cooled water-moderated light water power reactors) at Koodankulam in Tamil Nadu. A 2008 agreement caters for provision of an additional four third generation VVER-1200 reactors of capacity 1170 MW each. Russia has assisted in India’s efforts to design a nuclear plant for its nuclear submarine. In 2009, the Russians stated that Russia would not agree to curbs on export of sensitive technology to India. A new accord signed in Dec 2009 with Russia gives India freedom to proceed with the closed fuel cycle, which includes mining, preparation of the fuel for use in reactors, and reprocessing of spent fuel.

In October 2018, India and Russia signed an agreement to construct 6 nuclear reactors. Russian state-owned reactor manufacturer Rosatom stated that it would offer its third-generation VVER reactors. The agreement is not a firm contract, but rather an agreement to work toward a firm contract.

The nuclear agreement with USA led to India issuing a Letter of Intent for purchasing 10,000 MW from the USA. However, liability concerns and a few other issues are preventing further progress on the issue. Experts say that India's nuclear liability law discourages foreign nuclear companies. This law gives accident victims the right to seek damages from plant suppliers in the event of a mishap. It has "deterred foreign players like General Electric and Westinghouse Electric, a US-based unit of Toshiba, with companies asking for further clarification on compensation liability for private operators." On 5 October 2018, India and Russia signed an agreement to construct 6 Russian nuclear reactors in India.

The PHWR fleet of India, in analysis by M.V. Ramana, were constructed, fuelled and continue to operate, close to the price of Indian coal power stations.

Nuclear power plans

As of 2009, India envisaged to increase the contribution of nuclear power to overall electricity generation capacity from 2.8% to 9% within 25 years.
By 2020, India's installed nuclear power generation capacity was expected to increase to 20 GW. In fact, the 2020 capacity will not exceed 7 GW, as the 2018 operating capacity was only 6.2 GW, and only one more reactor was expected on line before 2020.
, India stands 13th in the world in terms nuclear capacity.
Indigenous atomic reactors include TAPS-3, and -4, both of which are 540 MW reactors.

The Indian nuclear power industry is expected to undergo a significant expansion in the coming years, in part due to the passing of the U.S.-India Civil Nuclear Agreement. 
This agreement will allow India to carry out trade of nuclear fuel and technologies with other countries and significantly enhance its power generation capacity.
When the agreement goes through, India is expected to generate an additional 25 GW of nuclear power by 2020, bringing total estimated nuclear power generation to 45 GW.

Risks related to nuclear power generation prompted Indian legislators to enact the 2010 Nuclear Liability Act which stipulates that nuclear suppliers, contractors and operators must bear financial responsibility in case of an accident.
The legislation addresses key issues such as nuclear radiation and safety regulations, operational control and maintenance management of nuclear power plants, compensation in the event of a radiation-leak accident, disaster clean-up costs, operator responsibility and supplier liability.
A nuclear accident like the 2011 Fukushima Daiichi nuclear disaster would have dire economic consequences in heavily populated India as did the 1984 Union Carbide Bhopal disaster, considered among the world's worst industrial disasters.

India has already been using imported enriched uranium for light-water reactors that are currently under IAEA safeguards, but it has developed other aspects of the nuclear fuel cycle to support its reactors.
Development of select technologies has been strongly affected by limited imports.
Use of heavy water reactors has been particularly attractive for the nation because it allows Uranium to be burnt with little to no enrichment capabilities.
India has also done a great amount of work in the development of a thorium centred fuel cycle.
While uranium deposits in the nation are limited there are much greater reserves of thorium and it could provide hundreds of times the energy with the same mass of fuel.
The fact that thorium can theoretically be utilised in heavy water reactors has tied the development of the two.
A prototype reactor that would burn Uranium-Plutonium fuel while irradiating a thorium blanket is under construction at Kalpakkam by BHAVINI.

Uranium used for the weapons programme has been separated from the power programme, using uranium from indigenous reserves. 
This domestic reserve of 80,000 to 112,000 tons of uranium (approx 1% of global uranium reserves) is large enough to supply all of India's commercial and military reactors as well as supply all the needs of India's nuclear weapons arsenal.
Currently, India's nuclear power reactors consume, at most, 478 tonnes of uranium per year.
Even if India were quadruple its nuclear power output (and reactor base) to 20 GW by 2020, nuclear power generation would only consume 2000 tonnes of uranium per annum. 
Based on India's known commercially viable reserves of 80,000 to 112,000 tons of uranium, this represents a 40–50 years uranium supply for India's nuclear power reactors (note with reprocessing and breeder reactor technology, this supply could be stretched out many times over). Furthermore, the uranium requirements of India's Nuclear Arsenal are only a fifteenth (1/15) of that required for power generation (approx. 32 tonnes), meaning that India's domestic fissile material supply is more than enough to meet all needs for it strategic nuclear arsenal. Therefore, India has sufficient uranium resources to meet its strategic and power requirements for the foreseeable future.

Former Indian President A. P. J. Abdul Kalam stated while he was in office that, "energy independence is India's first and highest priority. India has to go for nuclear power generation in a big way using thorium-based reactors. Thorium, a non-fissile material is available in abundance in our country." India has vast thorium reserves and quite limited uranium reserves.

The long-term goal of India's nuclear program has been to develop an advanced heavy-water thorium cycle. The first stage of this employs the pressurised heavy water reactors (PHWR) fuelled by natural uranium, and light water reactors, which produce plutonium incidentally to their prime purpose of electricity generation.
The second stage uses fast neutron reactors burning the plutonium with the blanket around the core having uranium as well as thorium, so that further plutonium (ideally high-fissile Pu) is produced as well as U-233.
The Atomic Minerals Directorate (AMD) has identified almost 12 million tonnes of monazite resources (typically with 6-7% thorium).
In stage 3, Advanced Heavy Water Reactors (AHWR) would burn thorium-plutonium fuels in such a manner that breeds U-233 which can eventually be used as a self-sustaining fissile driver for a fleet of breeding AHWRs. An alternative stage 3 is molten salt breeder reactors (MSBR), which are believed to be another possible option for eventual large-scale deployment.

In June 2014, Kudankulam-1 became the single largest power generating unit in India (1000 MWe).

In January 2021, India’s atomic energy secretary K.N. Vyas announced that the 700-megawatt pressurised heavy water reactor of the Kakrapar Atomic Power Station would be the first of the 16 such units planned in the country.

List of nuclear power plants

Currently, twenty-two nuclear power reactors have a total install capacity of 6,780 MW (1.8% of total installed base).

Note: Some sites may be abandoned if not found technically feasible or due to strategic, geopolitical, international and domestic issues.

Nuclear electricity generation

The details of the nuclear power generation capacity in the country are given below :

Anti-nuclear protests
Following the March 2011 Fukushima nuclear disaster in Japan, populations around proposed Indian NPP sites have launched protests that had found resonance around the country. There have been mass protests against the French-backed 9,900 MW Jaitapur Nuclear Power Project in Maharashtra and the Russian-backed 2,000 MW Koodankulam Nuclear Power Plant in Tamil Nadu. The Government of West Bengal initially refused permission to a proposed 6,000 MW facility near the town of Haripur that intended to host 6 Russian reactors. But after stiff resistance from locals, the proposed Nuclear Power Plant planned in Haripur has been shifted to Kavali in Andhra Pradesh. Interestingly, the Nuclear Power Plant planned at Kovvada in Andhra Pradesh was shifted from Mithi Virdi in Gujarat after locals in the Western state too showed resistance.

A Public-interest litigation (PIL) has also been filed against the government’s civil nuclear program at the Supreme Court. The PIL specifically asks for the "staying of all proposed nuclear power plants till satisfactory safety measures and cost-benefit analyses are completed by independent agencies". But the Supreme Court said it was not an expert in the nuclear field to issue a direction to the government on the nuclear liability issue.

See also

 Economics of nuclear power plants
 Energy policy of India
 Electricity sector in India
 Energy in India
 India's three-stage nuclear power programme
 List of nuclear reactors#India

References

External links 
 Nuclear Power Corporation of India
 Department of Atomic Energy
 Nuclear Power in India by the World Nuclear Association